Terry Board (born 14 September 1968) is a former Australian rules footballer who represented the Fitzroy Football Club in the Australian Football League (AFL) during the late 1980s and early 1990s.

Broad played in eight games with Fitzroy in 1988, before spending the next season out of football. He returned to the club in 1990, adding a further seven games to his career tally, before leaving the club at the end of 1991.

References

External links
 

1968 births
Living people
Fitzroy Football Club players
Old Paradians Amateur Football Club players
Australian rules footballers from Victoria (Australia)